José Luis Chacón (born 6 November 1971 in Callao) is a Peruvian football defender, who obtained three caps during his career for the Peru national football team. He was a member of the national squad at the 1999 Copa América. His former clubs include Hijos de Yurimaguas Callao, Deportivo Wanka, Alianza Lima, Sport Boys Callao, Estudiantes de Medicina, Atlético Universidad, Universidad San Martín de Porres and Club José Gálvez.

References

1971 births
Living people
Sportspeople from Callao
Association football defenders
Peruvian footballers
Peru international footballers
1999 Copa América players
Club Deportivo Wanka footballers
Club Alianza Lima footballers
Sport Boys footballers
Estudiantes de Medicina footballers
Atlético Universidad footballers
Club Deportivo Universidad de San Martín de Porres players
José Gálvez FBC footballers
Total Chalaco footballers
Sport Áncash footballers
Coronel Bolognesi footballers
Peruvian Primera División players